Pieris chumbiensis, the Chumbi white, is a small butterfly of the family Pieridae, the yellows and whites. It is found in the Chumbi Valley of Sikkim in India, and was once considered a race of P. dubernardi.

Description
Male upperside ground colour is white. Forewing has veins black, costal and terminal margins narrowly, apex more broadly, black; the inner margin of the black at apex forms an even curve; a large round black spot in middle of interspace 3, the lower discocellular edged on either side with black and the base of the wing irrorated with black scales. Hindwing: with a dark greyish appearance due to the dark markings of the underside that show through by transparency; veins black; a black costal spot a little before the apex, and the base of the wing heavily irrorated with black scales. Underside: forewing white, veins edged with black scaling, the round black spot in interspace 3 as on the upperside; apex and terminal margin suffused with yellow that decreases posteriorly on the latter. Hindwing: yellow, all the veins very broadly edged with black that gives an appearance of streaks to the ground colour; precostal area edged with deep cadmium yellow. Antennae, head, thorax and abdomen fuscous black. Female undescribed.

It has a wingspan of 54–58 mm.

See also
List of butterflies of India
List of butterflies of India (Pieridae)

References

chumbiensis
Butterflies described in 1897
Butterflies of Asia
Taxa named by Lionel de Nicéville